Nicolaus Bernoulli may refer to:
Nicolaus Bernoulli (1623–1708), see Bernoulli family
Nicolaus Bernoulli (1662–1716), see Bernoulli family
Nicolaus I Bernoulli (1687–1759), Swiss mathematician
Nicolaus II Bernoulli (1695–1726), Swiss mathematician